Herbert L. Hall (March 28, 1907 – March 5, 1996) was an American jazz clarinetist and alto saxophonist.

Early life 
Hall was born in Reserve, Louisiana, the brother of Edmond Hall and the son of clarinetist Edward Hall.

Career 
Hall began on banjo with the Niles Jazz Band (1923–1925), then settled on reeds. In 1926, he played with Kid Augustin Victor in Baton Rouge, and moved to New Orleans the following year. He played briefly with Sidney Desvigne, then played for over a decade with Don Albert (1929–1940), moving to San Antonio with him and remaining there until 1945.

After this he moved to Philadelphia, where he played with Herman Autrey; a few years later he was in New York, working with Doc Cheatham (1955) and toured Europe with Sammy Price (1955–56). He often played in New York jazz clubs, particularly Jimmy Ryan's and Eddie Condon's, in the late 1950s and 1960s. In 1968-69, he toured with Wild Bill Davison's Jazz Giants, and then a stint with an offshoot band of The Jazz Giants, called "Buzzy's Jazz Family" which included Herman Autrey, Benny Morton, Sonny Drootin, Eddie Gibbs and leader Buzzy Drootin on drums. He worked with Don Ewell in the 1970s. He also appeared in Bob Greene's Jelly Roll Morton revue show that decade.

Personal life 
Hall lived in Boerne, Texas.

Discography
 Old Tyme Modern (Sackville, 1969)
 Clarinet Duets with Albert Nicholas  (GHB, 1969)
 John - Doc & Herb with Fessor's Nighthawks (Storyville, 1979)

References

External links
Interview with Herb Hall, February 23, 1980. University of Texas at San Antonio: Institute of Texan Cultures: Oral History Collection, UA 15.01, University of Texas at San Antonio Libraries Special Collections.

1907 births
1996 deaths
American jazz clarinetists
American jazz saxophonists
American male saxophonists
20th-century American saxophonists
20th-century American male musicians
American male jazz musicians
Sackville Records artists
People from Reserve, Louisiana
People from St. John the Baptist Parish, Louisiana
People from Boerne, Texas
People from Kendall County, Texas
People from San Antonio
Musicians from San Antonio